Frankfort was originally homesteaded in 1876 in Pacific County on the mouth of the Columbia River near Portuguese Point.  In 1890, a planned community was platted by two promoters Frank Bourne and Frank Scott (whence the name).   Together they envisioned a resort community at the location.  Lots were sold on the premise that the railroad would build a line through the community (the only access at the time was via boat).  A post office, general store, saloon, sawmill and a hotel were built and a newspaper (the Frankfort Chronicle) was established.  The financial Panic of 1893 scared away future investors, and the town took a downhill turn.  

Frankfort survived mainly as a Logging town until just after the turn of the 20th century.  Unfortunately, no railroad line ever materialized and Frankfort began fading away. The post office closed in 1918. In 1953, Frankfort was sold to a logging company and by 1960 had only two residents. Very little remnants of the town exist today, apart from a few building foundations. There are no public roads which lead to the area and access by foot is difficult.

References

Ghost towns in Washington (state)
Geography of Pacific County, Washington